Izvoru Crișului; is a commune in Cluj County, Transylvania, Romania. It is composed of four villages: Izvoru Crișului, Nadășu (Kalotanádas), Nearșova (Nyárszó) and Șaula (Sárvásár).

Demographics

At the 2011 census, 79.0% of inhabitants were Hungarians and 19.9% Romanians.

Notes

References
Atlasul localităților județului Cluj (Cluj County Localities Atlas), Suncart Publishing House, Cluj-Napoca,

Images

Communes in Cluj County
Localities in Transylvania